The Cabinet of Sarawak is the decision making organ of the executive branch of the Government of Sarawak, Malaysia. The cabinet consists of the Premier, appointed by the Governor on the basis that they are able to command a majority in the Sarawak State Legislative Assembly, as well as a number of ministers appointed from members of the legislature on the advice of the Premier.

The cabinet is similar in structure and role to that of the federal level, while being smaller in size. As federal and state responsibilities differ, there are a number of portfolios that differ between the federal and state governments.

Cabinet ministers are always the head of a ministry.

Present composition

Ministers

Deputy Ministers

List of cabinets

See also 
 Yang di-Pertua Negeri of Sarawak
 Premier of Sarawak
 Sarawak State Legislative Assembly

References

External links 
 Sarawak State Government

Politics of Sarawak
Sarawak